Eotitanosuchus ("dawn giant crocodile") is an extinct genus of biarmosuchian therapsids whose fossils were found in the town of Ochyor in Perm Krai, Russia. It lived about 267 million years ago. The only species is Eotitanosuchus olsoni.

Description

Eotitanosuchus is known from a single large skull without a lower jaw. Like Biarmosuchus tener, it was primitive in that, though it was a predator, the temple opening behind the eye was small, giving it a weak bite. The temple was, however, larger at the top than in other biarmosuchians.

Paleoecology
Eotitanosuchus fossils were found in the Perm (or Cis-Urals) region of Russia. Eotitanosuchus was without doubt a dominant animal of its environment. Found preserved in flood deposits (once coastal bogs) containing many skeletons of estemmenosuchids, it has been suggested that this large predator was an excellent swimmer, possibly semi-aquatic or frequenting marshy ground. This, however, is just speculation.

Classification
Eotitanosuchus is often grouped with the Phthinosuchidae and the Biarmosuchidae. In fact, Ivakhnenko (1999) argues that Biarmosuchus tener and Eotitanosuchus olsoni are the same organism, which would eliminate the Eotitanosuchia as a separate taxon, though this conclusion does not seem to have been widely accepted. Regardless of the eventual outcome of this debate, Ivakhnenko's paper does seem to show that Eotitanosuchus is very similar to Biarmosuchus. Further, given the rather close similarity between Eotitanosuchus and later therapsids, this observation supports the view that Biarmosuchia is paraphyletic. Others view Eotitanosuchus as quite distinct from other basal therapsids and perhaps closer to the Gorgonopsia but gorgonopsian specializations are either not present in Eotitanosuchus or, as is more often the case, the state of the characters is unknown. This genus is characterized by many primitive features of the septomaxilla, the postorbital, the parietal, the interparietal, the basioccipital, the quadrate rami of the pterygoid and the vomers of the skull. The length of the dorsal process of the premaxilla (front jawbone) and the postorbital twisting (rear side of the skull) constitute specializations that indicate it is not a direct gorgonopsian ancestor. These features, however, are shared by the anteosaur and biarmosuchid lineages.

See also 

List of therapsids

References 

 
 
 Patricia Vickers-Rich and Thomas H. Rich, The Great Russian Dinosaurs, Gunter Graphics, 1993, pg. 28.

External links 
 Eotitanosuchidae at Kheper
 Eotitanosuchidae
 Therapsida: Biarmosuchia: Biarmosuchidae / Eotitanosuchidae at Palaeos
Therapsida: Biarmosuchia at Palaeos

Biarmosuchians
Prehistoric therapsid genera
Wordian genera
Guadalupian synapsids of Europe
Permian Russia
Fossils of Russia
Fossil taxa described in 1960